In enzymology, a NAD+-dinitrogen-reductase ADP-D-ribosyltransferase is an enzyme that catalyzes the chemical reaction

NAD+ + [dinitrogen reductase]  nicotinamide + ADP-D-ribosyl-[dinitrogen reductase]

Thus, the two substrates of this enzyme are NAD+ and dinitrogen reductase, whereas its two products are nicotinamide and ADP-D-ribosyl-[dinitrogen reductase].

This enzyme belongs to the family of glycosyltransferases, specifically the pentosyltransferases.  The systematic name of this enzyme class is NAD+:[dinitrogen reductase] (ADP-D-ribosyl)transferase. Other names in common use include NAD-azoferredoxin (ADPribose)transferase, and NAD-dinitrogen-reductase ADP-D-ribosyltransferase.

References

 
 

EC 2.4.2
NADH-dependent enzymes
Enzymes of unknown structure